Lewis Clark (1923–2003) was a Canadian politician.

Lewis Clark or Lewis Clarke may also refer to:

 Lewis Gaylord Clark (1808–1873), American magazine editor and publisher
 Lewis Clarke (c. 1812–1897), American former slave, author, and lecturer
 Lewis Whitehouse Clark (1828–1900), American judge
 Lewis Clarke (priest), Archdeacon of Llandaff, Wales, from 1977 to 1988
 Lewis J. Clarke (1927–2021), English-American landscape architect

See also
 Lewis and Clark (disambiguation)
 Lewis-Clark Valley
 Lewis Clarkson
 Louis Clarke (disambiguation)
 Lois Clark